This was the first edition of the tournament.

Yoshihito Nishioka won the title after defeating Denis Istomin 6–4, 6–7(4–7), 7–6(7–3) in the final.

Seeds

Draw

Finals

Top half

Bottom half

References
Main Draw
Qualifying Draw

Astana Challenger Capital Cup - Singles